The Final Option is a 1994 Hong Kong action film written and directed by Gordon Chan and starring Michael Wong, Peter Yung, Carmen Lee, Vindy Chan and Power Chan.

Plot
Because the risk of police work is getting higher, uniformed patrol officer Ho Chi-wai (Peter Yung) receives pressure from his family, which leads him to doubt his own profession and his attitude also becomes negative. One time during an armed robbery case in a jewelry store, witnesses his colleague, Butt (Ken Lok), being killed by the robbers, which changes his views about the meaning of life and being a police officer. Chi-wai is shoulder the responsibility to protect civilians and joins the Special Duties Unit (SDU). During training, due to a series of difficult physical and mental challenges, many trainees decided to quit. Chi-wai, however, completes his training with his spirit of perseverance. With the influence of his instructor, Stone (Michael Wong, Chi-wai builds self-confidence. However, Chi-wai gradually discovers problems that the SDU has to face, including ones from family, friends, superior officers, criminals and even public pressure. Because Chi-wai's profession makes his girlfriend, May (Carmen Lee), to lack a sense of security, they become estranged until a counterinsurgency operation, when May finally understands Chi-wai, while he also understands the meaning of being an SDU officer.

Cast
Michael Wong as Stone Wong
Peter Yung as Ho Chi-wai
Carmen Lee as May Lee
Vindy Chan as Windy
Power Chan as Bond
Ken Kot as Ken
Ricky Lam
Dante Lam
Matthew Tang
Tai Ho-fai
Paul Fonoroff as Security Commissioner
Luk Man-wai as Frankie
Joseph Cheung as Joe
Michael Lam as Ching
Lau Jim
Wayne Lai as Traffic cop
Emotion Cheung as Policeman
Yvonne Ho as Bond's girlfriend
Lam Tak-shing
Lai Wai-tak
Sin Kam-ching
Tsang Chi-chung
Hung Lap-ming
Ken Lok as Butt
Luk Chi-shing
Teddy Chan
Bruce Law
Liu Lai-man
Michael Lam as SDU trainee
So Wai-nam as SDU trainee
Gary Mak as SDU trainee
Lui Siu-ming as SDU trainee
Kwan Kwok-chung as SDU trainee
Lee Yiu-king as Rascal at nightclub
Kim Yip as Photographer
Stephen Chan
Jacky Cheung Chun-hung
Hui Sze-man
To Wai-kwong
Wong Man-chun as Policeman
Lau Tung-ching
Cheung Bing-chuen as Rascal at nightclub

Release
The Final Option was released in Hong Kong on 17 March 1994. In the Philippines, the film was released by Screen Enterprise Co. on November 9, 1995.

References

External links

1994 films
1990s crime action films
1990s Cantonese-language films
Films directed by Gordon Chan
Films set in Hong Kong
Films shot in Hong Kong
Golden Harvest films
Hong Kong crime action films
Police detective films
1990s Hong Kong films